Federal Route 13, Asian Highway Route AH150 (formerly Federal Route A5), is a 268 km-long federal highway in Sabah, Malaysia. It is a component of the larger Pan Borneo Highway network. This highway runs primarily along the southeastern coast of Sabah from Sandakan to Tawau. The major towns it passes through include (from north to south) Kinabatangan, Lahad Datu and Kunak.

List of interchanges 

Highways in Malaysia
Roads in Sabah